Using Thematic Analysis in Psychology is a seminal psychology paper on thematic analysis by Virginia Braun and Victoria Clarke published in 2006 in Qualitative Research in Psychology. The paper has over 70,000 Google Scholar citations and according to Google Scholar is the most cited academic paper published in 2006.

References

External links
Using thematic analysis in psychology

2006 essays
Social science essays
Qualitative research